The 1958 North Texas State Eagles football team was an American football team that represented North Texas State College (now known as the University of North Texas) during the 1958 NCAA University Division football season as a member of the Missouri Valley Conference. In their 13th year under head coach Odus Mitchell, the team compiled a 7–2–1 record.

Schedule

References

North Texas State
North Texas Mean Green football seasons
Missouri Valley Conference football champion seasons
North Texas State Mean Green football